Miedniewice-Topola  is a village in the administrative district of Gmina Skierniewice, within Skierniewice County, Łódź Voivodeship, in central Poland.

The village has a population of 153.

References 

Villages in Skierniewice County